Irwin is a city in Shelby County, Iowa, United States, along the West Nishnabotna River. The population was 319 at the time of the 2020 census.

History
The Western Town Lot Company established Irwin in 1881.  The town was named for E. W. Irwin, the property owner.  Irwin was incorporated in 1892.

Geography
Irwin is located at  (41.790449, -95.207341).

Demographics

2010 census
As of the census of 2010, there were 341 people, 165 households, and 97 families residing in the city. The racial makeup of the city was 98.8% White, 0.6% from other races, and 0.6% from two or more races. Hispanic or Latino of any race were 1.2% of the population.

There were 165 households, of which 21.2% had children under the age of 18 living with them, 51.5% were married couples living together, 6.1% had a female householder with no husband present, 1.2% had a male householder with no wife present, and 41.2% were non-families. 37.6% of all households were made up of individuals, and 20% had someone living alone who was 65 years of age or older. The average household size was 2.07 and the average family size was 2.71.

The median age in the city was 52.3 years. 18.5% of residents were under the age of 18; 6.5% were between the ages of 18 and 24; 15.3% were from 25 to 44; 29.9% were from 45 to 64; and 29.9% were 65 years of age or older. The gender makeup of the city was 47.2% male and 52.8% female.

2000 census
As of the census of 2000, there were 372 people, 168 households, and 110 families residing in the city. The racial makeup of the city was 98.92% White, 0.27% African American, 0.27% Native American, and 0.54% from two or more races. Hispanic or Latino of any race were 2.15% of the population.

There were 168 households, out of which 25.0% had children under the age of 18 living with them, 57.7% were married couples living together, 6.0% had a female householder with no husband present, and 34.5% were non-families. 32.1% of all households were made up of individuals, and 19.0% had someone living alone who was 65 years of age or older. The average household size was 2.21 and the average family size was 2.76.

In the city, the population was spread out, with 21.2% under the age of 18, 6.2% from 18 to 24, 22.6% from 25 to 44, 24.2% from 45 to 64, and 25.8% who were 65 years of age or older. The median age was 45 years. For every 100 females, there were 90.8 males. For every 100 females age 18 and over, there were 91.5 males.

The median income for a household in the city was $30,417, and the median income for a family was $40,000. Males had a median income of $28,000 versus $18,393 for females. The per capita income for the city was $15,429. About 7.4% of families and 9.8% of the population were below the poverty line, including 9.8% of those under age 18 and 13.5% of those age 65 or over.

Education 
Irwin is served by the IKM–Manning Community School District.

It was previously in the Irwin Community School District until July 1, 1992, when it merged into the IKM Community School District. That in turn, on July 1, 2011, merged into IKM–Manning.

References

Cities in Iowa
Cities in Shelby County, Iowa